Patryk Klofik (born May 15, 1986) is a Polish footballer. He was born in Piła, and currently plays for Drwęca Nowe Miasto Lubawskie.

External links
 

1986 births
Living people
Śląsk Wrocław players
Zagłębie Lubin players
Zawisza Bydgoszcz players
Mieszko Gniezno players
Kania Gostyń players
Calisia Kalisz players
Polish footballers
People from Piła
Sportspeople from Greater Poland Voivodeship
Association football midfielders
Sokół Pniewy players